Jacob Ruby (born December 13, 1992) is a Canadian football offensive lineman for the Ottawa Redblacks of the Canadian Football League (CFL). Previously, he played for the Montreal Alouettes of the CFL. Ruby played football throughout his youth and played for both high school and college teams. He was a 2010 graduate of Fork Union Military Academy. Ruby was a four-year starter at the University of Richmond.

High school 
Ruby began his football career with Medway High School in Ontario before moving to Fork Union Military Academy Where he was an All-Prep League player. He also played two years of club football for the London Falcons. During his time at the London Falcons, he was named as the teams Most Outstanding Offensive Player. In 2008, he played tight end for FUMA and in 2009 played tackle; earning him an All-State and All-Prep honors.

In January 2010, Ruby was one of 90 players selected to play in the USA vs. The World All-Star game which was broadcast on live TV. In 2010, he was redshirted.

College
In 2011, Ruby played all 11 games on the offensive line and made 10 starts. He recorded two tackles, one coming against Massachusetts and the other at Delaware.

In 2012 Ruby and the Spiders won a share of the Colonial Athletic Association conference championship, but were snubbed from a playoff spot.

In 2014 Ruby started all 14 games for the Spiders at Offensive Tackle and was named Third Team All-Conference and a 2nd Team VaSid player. The Spiders reached the quarter finals of the Football Championship Subdivision playoffs.

Professional career

Montreal Alouettes
Ruby was selected in the first round, eighth overall, in the 2015 CFL Draft by the Montreal Alouettes and signed with the team on May 27, 2015. He dressed for three games in his rookie year in 2015 and played in 17 regular season games in 2016. He began the 2017 season on the injured list, but was then released by the Alouettes on July 5, 2017.

Edmonton Eskimos/Elks
Shortly after his release from Montreal, Ruby signed with the Edmonton Eskimos on July 17, 2017, and played in two games during the 2017 season. He played in 15 games in 2018, starting two, and became a regular starter in 2019 when he played and started in 17 regular season games.

Ruby did not play in 2020 due to the cancellation of the 2020 CFL season. Instead, he re-signed with Edmonton to a contract extension through 2022 on December 26, 2020. He played and started in the first three regular season games for the newly named Edmonton Elks in 2021, but was released on August 31, 2021, due to a violation of COVID-19 protocols. Ruby reportedly misrepresented his vaccination status to the Elks and was subsequently barred from signing with any CFL teams for the remainder of the 2021 season.

Ottawa Redblacks
On January 10, 2022, it was announced that Ruby had signed with the Ottawa Redblacks.

References

External links
 Ottawa Redblacks bio

Living people
1992 births
Canadian football offensive linemen
American football offensive linemen
Canadian players of American football
Richmond Spiders football players
Montreal Alouettes players
Players of Canadian football from Ontario
Sportspeople from London, Ontario
Edmonton Elks players
Ottawa Redblacks players